A middle-market newspaper is a newspaper that caters to readers who like entertainment as well as the coverage of important news events. Middle-market status is the halfway point of a three-level continuum of journalistic seriousness; upper-market or "quality" newspapers generally cover hard news, and down-market newspapers favour sensationalist stories.

In the United Kingdom, since the discontinuation of Today (1986–1995), the only national middle-market papers are the Daily Mail and the Daily Express, distinguishable by their black-top masthead (both use the tabloid paper size), as opposed to the red-top mastheads of down-market tabloids. USA Today and the Times of India are other typical middle-market broadsheet newspapers, headquartered in the United States and India, respectively. A daily supplement devoted to coverage of Page 3 events is a salient feature of such newspapers in India.

References

Newspapers